The Great fire of Tartu took place on  and destroyed most of the city of Tartu in what is now Estonia. The fire destroyed the centre of the city.

History
Tartu had lost most of its major stone buildings when they were blown up in September 1708 on the orders of Peter the Great during the Great Northern War. The Russian tsar ordered that the buildings in Tartu (then called Dorpat) should be mined to prevent the Swedes from using the town as a military base. This was just one of the sieges which Tartu was subjected to during its history, but this time the city was left burning and in ruins. When the war finished, the population returned to Tartu, and the desperate need for houses created an abundance of new wooden buildings. The buildings had to be built of wood as the Tsar had laid orders that no stone buildings were to be built anywhere except in the new Russian capital St. Petersburg. 

The first large fire occurred in 1763. The following year Catherine the Great visited, and some rebuilding took place. The "Great Fire" occurred in 1775. It started in the backyard of Knights Street near St. John's Church. A strong wind allowed the fire to spread from building to building, and the wooden bridges allowed the fire to cross the river to do further damage. Nearly 200 wooden buildings were destroyed and over 40 stone buildings. The city was further damaged  when eighteen buildings were purposefully destroyed to create fire breaks.

At the end of the fire only 160 buildings remained: most of these were to the north of the city. There were only forty left standing in the former centre of the city. Uppsala House, which is near St. John's church, claims to be one of the few buildings now remaining that date from before the fire. Some of its timbers have been dated to 1750.

After the fire
Following the fire the city was rebuilt. After the fire the rules that had required that there be no new stone buildings were reversed and it was now required to construct not only new buildings but also fences and outbuildings without using wood. The cornerstone of Tartu Town Hall was laid in 1782 and completed under the command of Johann Heinrich Bartholomäus Walter.  

Catherine the Great found 25,000 rubles to ease the situation in Tartu after the fire, and the money was used to build a stone bridge across the river. The remains of this bridge can still be seen beneath the river Emajõgi but the main part of the bridge was destroyed during the Second World War.

References

18th-century fires
History of Tartu
Fires in Russia
18th century in Estonia
Urban fires in Europe
1775 disasters in the Russian Empire